Jasper County is a county in the U.S. state of Iowa. As of the 2020 census, the population was 37,813. The county seat is Newton. The county was organized in 1846 and is named after Sergeant William Jasper, a Revolutionary War hero.

Jasper County is part of the Des Moines–West Des Moines, IA Metropolitan Statistical Area.

Geography
The North and South Skunk River flow through the county. Bodies of water include Lake Mariposa and Rock Creek.

Major highways

 Interstate 80
 U.S. Highway 6
 U.S. Highway 65
 Iowa Highway 14
 Iowa Highway 117
 Iowa Highway 163
 Iowa Highway 224
 Iowa Highway 330

Transit
 List of intercity bus stops in Iowa

Adjacent counties
Marshall County  (north)
Poweshiek County  (east)
Mahaska County  (southeast)
Marion County  (south)
Polk County  (west)
Story County  (northwest)

Demographics

2020 census
There were 16,132 housing units, of which 14,994 were occupied.

2010 census
There were 16,181 housing units, of which 14,806 were occupied.

2000 census

As of the census of 2000, there were 37,213 people, 14,689 households, and 10,267 families residing in the county.  The population density was 51 people per square mile (20/km2).  There were 15,659 housing units at an average density of 22 per square mile (8/km2).  The racial makeup of the county was 97.58% White, 0.83% Black or African American, 0.22% Native American, 0.44% Asian, 0.05% Pacific Islander, 0.26% from other races, and 0.62% from two or more races.  1.01% of the population were Hispanic or Latino of any race.

There were 14,689 households, out of which 31.70% had children under the age of 18 living with them, 59.30% were married couples living together, 7.40% had a female householder with no husband present, and 30.10% were non-families. 26.10% of all households were made up of individuals, and 11.80% had someone living alone who was 65 years of age or older.  The average household size was 2.42 and the average family size was 2.92.

In the county, the population was spread out, with 24.60% under the age of 18, 7.40% from 18 to 24, 28.60% from 25 to 44, 23.40% from 45 to 64, and 16.00% who were 65 years of age or older.  The median age was 38 years. For every 100 females there were 101.60 males.  For every 100 females age 18 and over, there were 99.70 males.

The median income for a household in the county was $41,683, and the median income for a family was $50,071. Males had a median income of $36,001 versus $24,770 for females. The per capita income for the county was $19,622.  About 4.80% of families and 6.50% of the population were below the poverty line, including 7.10% of those under age 18 and 7.00% of those age 65 or over.

Government and infrastructure
The Iowa Department of Corrections Newton Correctional Facility is in an unincorporated area in Jasper County, near Newton.

Communities

Cities

Baxter
Colfax
Kellogg
Lambs Grove
Lynnville
Mingo
Mitchellville 
(part)
Monroe
Newton
Oakland Acres
Prairie City
Reasnor
Sully
Valeria

Unincorporated communities
Ira
Killduff
Newburg
Rushville

Townships

Buena Vista
Clear Creek
Des Moines
Elk Creek
Fairview
Hickory Grove
Independence
Kellogg
Lynn Grove
Malaka
Mariposa
Mound Prairie
Newton
Palo Alto
Poweshiek
Richland
Rock Creek
Sherman
Washington

Population ranking
The population ranking of the following table is based on the 2020 census of Jasper County.

† county seat

Notable people
 John M. Haines, tenth Governor of Idaho; born in Jasper County. 
 Lyle Goodhue, chemist and inventor, born in Jasper County.
 Sara Haines, American television host and journalist.

See also

National Register of Historic Places listings in Jasper County, Iowa

References

External links

Jasper County government's website

 
1846 establishments in Iowa Territory
Populated places established in 1846